Masterpiece Trilogy Limited Edition is a series of three box sets from singer Chrisye which is a collection of all of Chrisye's albums issued between 1978–2004. Each box set contains 7 CDs and a booklet.

In the 26-year span, Chrisye released 21 albums, beginning with Sabda Alam (1978) and ending with Senyawa (2004). However, the box set does not contain Jurang Pemisah which is produced by an independent label, Pramaqua Records.

Discography
Trilogi 1 (First Trilogy)
 Sabda Alam (1978)
 Percik Pesona (1979)
 Puspa Indah (1980)
 Pantulan Cita (1981)
 Resesi (1983)
 Metropolitan (1984)
 Nona (1984)

Trilogi 2 (Second Trilogy)
 Sendiri (1984)
 Aku Cinta Dia (1985)
 Hip Hip Hura (1985)
 Nona Lisa (1986)
 Jumpa Pertama (1988)
 Pergilah Kasih (1989)
 Cintamu Telah Berlalu (1990)

Trilogi 3 (Third Trilogy)
 Sendiri Lagi (1993)
 AkustiChrisye (1996)
 Kala Cinta Menggoda (1997)
 Badai Pasti Berlalu
 Konser Tur 2001 (2001)
 Dekade (2002)
 Senyawa (2004)

External links
 Chrisye Online

2007 compilation albums
Chrisye albums